Lathyrus libani, the Lebanon vetchling  is a species of wild peas in the  in legume family, Fabaceae.

References

Flora of Lebanon
libani